HMAS Limicola was a small ship of the Royal Australian Navy during World War II, serving as an Anti-submarine indicator loop repair ship. Limicola was a "ship taken up from trade" (STUFT) during the War.

It served until at least 1952 when, in October of that year, it was involved in Operation Hurricane, the British nuclear bomb test  in the lagoon in the Montebello Islands off Western Australia’s Pilbara region.

Limicola as a name is from the Latin meaning "one that dwells in the mud". There are various birds with this word in their scientific name, notably in the Scolopacidae (waders and shorebirds) such as the broad-billed sandpiper (Limicola falcinellus). Limicolaria are land snails.

External links
 A picture of Limicola

References

Auxiliary ships of the Royal Australian Navy
Patrol vessels of the Royal Australian Navy